Deh Bagh (also Romanized as Deh Bāgh) is a village in Dowrahan Rural District, Gandoman District, Borujen County, Chaharmahal and Bakhtiari Province, Iran. At the 2006 census, its population was 12, in 5 families.

References 

Populated places in Borujen County